Yvonne Kennedy (January 8, 1945 – December 8, 2012) was an Alabama state representative from Mobile, Alabama, and a former president of Bishop State Community College. She served as national president of Delta Sigma Theta sorority from 1988 to 1992.

Biography
Kennedy was born to Leroy and Thelma Kennedy and attended Bishop State Community College and Alabama State University. She became president of Bishop State in 1981 and resigned from that position in 2007. She has represented Mobile in the Alabama House of Representatives since winning a special election in 1979.
She died on December 8, 2012, at UAB Hospital in Birmingham, Alabama.

References

External links

1945 births
2012 deaths
Alabama State University alumni
American educators
Delta Sigma Theta members
Democratic Party members of the Alabama House of Representatives
Politicians from Mobile, Alabama
University of Alabama alumni
Delta Sigma Theta presidents